God Tussi Great Ho is a 2008 Indian fantasy comedy film, written and directed by Rumi Jaffery and starring Amitabh Bachchan, Salman Khan, Priyanka Chopra and Sohail Khan. According to director Rohit Dhawan, the film is a remake of the 2003 Hollywood comedy Bruce Almighty, starring Jim Carrey, Morgan Freeman and Jennifer Aniston.

Plot
Arun Prajapati (Salman Khan) has been trying to be a successful TV anchor, but success has always eluded him. He blames God (Amitabh Bachchan) for this lack of success. Arun is head over heels in love with Alia Kapoor (Priyanka Chopra), who is a TV anchor and a well-known star working in the same channel, but he has never been able to express his love for her.

When Rocky (Sohail Khan) is appointed as an anchor for the channel, Arun starts believing that Rocky will win Alia. Later, Arun is sacked from the channel after the launch of his new show was sabotaged by Rocky. He has nobody to blame but God Himself, whom he later meets in person. An argument ensues between the two, at the end of which God then decides to give Arun the power over all things for ten days, wherein Arun may prove that he is a better operator of the universe.

Arun uses this power to get his job back and put Rocky into an uneasy spot and win Alia's heart. After God scolds him for only making things better for himself, Arun starts listening to people's prayers. He later realizes that considering each person's wishes individually would be too time-consuming, so to save time and effort he grants EVERYBODY’S wishes, including the wish of criminals to be free and Rocky's wish that Alia marries him. The criminals crash Rocky and Alia's wedding and Alia is shot by one of the criminals.

Arun later asks God why is everything happening to him. God explains it is his own fault and that everyone cannot blame Him for this. Arun feels bad, but God forgives him and starts his life over again. During the game show, he tricks Rocky into lying about loving Alia Kapoor (who was present on the show, as it was the channel "Zoop"'s first game show), and Alia turns on him. Arun wins the heart of Alia.

Cast
Amitabh Bachchan as God
Salman Khan as Arun Prajapati
Priyanka Chopra as Alia Kapoor
Sohail Khan as Rakesh "Rocky" Sharma
Anupam Kher as Jagmohan Prajapati
Dalip Tahil as Jagdish Kewalchandani
Beena Kak as Rashmi Prajapati
Upasana Singh as Divya Singh
Rukhsar Rehman as Madhu Prajapati
Sanjay Mishra as Murari Sadhu
Rajpal Yadav as Rangeela Prakash
Satish Kaushik as Politician Dhirendra "Netaji" Mittal

Box office
God Tussi Great Ho was not considered commercially successful. However the movie has emerged as a moderate success on the home video circuit. The film's satellite rights had a long court battle between the producer and Shemaroo Entertainment.The verdict was in favor with the producer who sold the satellite rights to Zee TV

Soundtrack

The music of the film is composed by Sajid–Wajid, and the lyrics are penned by Jalees Sherwani, Shabbir Ahmed and Deven Shukla.

Track listing

References

External links
 
 
 God Tussi Great Ho at Indiafm.com

2000s Hindi-language films
2008 films
2008 romantic comedy films
2000s fantasy comedy films
2000s romantic fantasy films
Indian romantic comedy films
Indian fantasy comedy films
Indian romantic fantasy films
Films shot in Mumbai
Indian religious comedy films
Hindi remakes of English films
Indian remakes of American films
T-Series (company) films